Moho (previously marketed as Anime Studio) is a proprietary vector-based 2D animation application distributed by Lost Marble LLC. It has two different packages: Moho Pro and Moho Debut, similar to the pro version but with features restricted.

History
The software was originally developed under the name "Moho" in 1999 by Mike Clifton at Lost Marble. The software was distributed by E Frontier until 2007, when it was acquired by Smith Micro and renamed Anime Studio, as a marketing companion for the former Manga Studio. 

In 2010, Smith Micro released Anime Studio 7, which added features such as Physics, 3D creation and an improved interface.

In 2011, Anime Studio 8 added features such as the Character Wizard, layered Photoshop import, and real-time media connection. Version 8.1 also supported the new Poser 9 SDK and integrated the Wacom multi-touch API, allowing it to work natively with Wacom's Bamboo and Intuos tablets.

In 2012, Smith Micro released Anime Studio 9, with new features including Smart Bones, Editable Motion Graphs, and Bézier handles, as well as enhancements to the timeline, key frames, and onionskins.

In 2014, Anime Studio 10 contained upgraded features and new mechanics to its predecessor. 

In 2015, Anime Studio 11 added frame-by-frame animation, layer referencing, animated shape ordering, enhanced tools and brushes, JSON file format support, and other features.

In 2016, Anime Studio was renamed Moho by Smith Micro Software to reflect the software's ability to do more than just anime. 

In 2016, Moho 12 was released with Pin Bones, optimized Bézier handles, improved free hand tools, Smart Warp, real motion blur, and more. Moho Pro 12 was released in August 2016. In October 2016, Moho became available for the Microsoft Surface Studio. Smith Micro worked with Microsoft to develop Moho functionality for the Surface Dial peripheral. This feature set enabled users to create animations more quickly and easily through functions such as a new overlay timeline, rigged characters, rotating canvases and frame-by-frame animation.

In June 2019, Moho 13 introduced new bitmap tools, including bitmap frame to frame capabilities, and re-engineered 3D objects support.

On 22 December 2020, it was announced that the Moho 2D animation software had been acquired by Lost Marble LLC, a company founded by Mike Clifton, the original creator of Moho, and Victor Paredes, Supervisor of Moho animation at Cartoon Saloon and former Moho Product Manager.

On 26 April 2021, Lost Marble LLC released Moho 13.5, with new features including Vitruvian Bones, Wind Dynamics and Quad meshes, as well as a slightly refreshed User Interface.

Notable uses

Feature films

 Romeo & Juliet: Sealed with a Kiss (Phil Nibbelink Productions) - 2006
 To the Top of the World (Cine-Clube de Avanca)
 The Secret of Kells (Cartoon Saloon) - 2009
 Technotise: Edit & I (Yodi Movie Craftsman; Black, White & Green studio) - 2009
 Song of the Sea (Cartoon Saloon) - 2014
 The Breadwinner (Cartoon Saloon) - 2017
 Wolfwalkers (Cartoon Saloon) - 2020
 My Father's Dragon (Cartoon Saloon) - 2022

Short films, TV and Web series
 Club Baboo (Frame Order)
 Puffin Rock (Cartoon Saloon) - 2015
 Pete the Cat (Amazon Studios) - 2018
 Jay’s Life on YouTube (Kartoon Management)
 Lil’ Ron Ron on YouTube (Cartoon Connect)
 Phungus & Mowld on Amazon Prime Video (Pixelblast Animation) - 2020

See also
List of 2D animation software
Manga Studio

References

External links
Moho (Anime Studio) - Official Page
Lost Marble LLC - Official Page
Moho (Anime Studio) Forum - Official Page
Moho (Anime Studio) Tutorials
Moho Scripting - Scripting Documentation

Animation software
2D animation software
Lua (programming language)-scriptable software